Pesthouse Common, Richmond is an area of public open space on Queen's Road,  Richmond in the London Borough of Richmond upon Thames. It is bordered by mature lime and horse chestnut trees and is managed by Richmond upon Thames London Borough Council to promote nature conservation.

History
The common is so called as it had a pest house, a structure used for quarantining people with communicable diseases. The common, which used to belong to the Crown, originally extended from the bottom of Queen's Road to the gates of Richmond Park. It had, near the site of the present Lass o' Richmond Hill pub on Queen's Road, a "pound overt" (open pound). Goods or cattle belonging to those had failed to pay fines imposed by the local courts were put there.

A 1785 Act of Parliament granted the common to Richmond vestry, and it was then enclosed for a workhouse and burial ground, except for a small portion next to the lower part of Queen's Road. The pest house itself was pulled down in 1787.

See also
 Richmond Cemetery

Notes

References

External links
 Official website

Further reading
 Archer, John; Curson, David (1993). Nature Conservation in Richmond upon Thames, Ecology Handbook 21, London Ecology Unit,  p.80

Common land in London
History of the London Borough of Richmond upon Thames
Parks and open spaces in the London Borough of Richmond upon Thames
Quarantine facilities in the United Kingdom
Richmond, London